Dr. Hugo Mascie-Taylor is a medical doctor and administrator.

He has worked as Executive Medical Director of Leeds Teaching Hospitals NHS Trust, including periods acting as Chief Executive and
Medical Director at the NHS Confederation.

He was one of two trust special administrators appointed to manage  Mid Staffordshire NHS Foundation Trust in April 2013.

In May 2014 he was appointed Medical Director and Executive Director of Patient and Clinical Engagement, for Monitor (NHS). As of 2015, Mascie-Taylor was paid a salary of between £195,000 and £199,999 by Monitor, making him one of the 328 most highly paid people in the British public sector at that time.

He is also a board member of Medical Education England and of the UK Revalidation Programme Board of the General Medical Council  He was formerly on the Policy Board of NHS Employers.

He is also Visiting Professor at the University of Leeds and chairs OPT IN, a charity helping British healthcare professionals deliver training in partner hospitals in low income countries.

References

Administrators in the National Health Service
Fellows of the Royal College of Physicians
Living people
Year of birth missing (living people)